Mellie Dunham (July 29, 1853 - September 27, 1931) was an American fiddler during the early twentieth century. Dunham was born in Norway, Maine, the son of Alanson Mellen Dunham and Christiana Bent. He came to prominence after he was invited to play for Henry Ford at his house in Dearborn, Michigan. Ford sent a Pullman car for Dunham and his wife, Emma "Gram" Dunham (née Richardson), because of Ford's love of country music. While Ford had invited 38 other fiddlers before Dunham, none received as much attention as Dunham did.

He was also a snowshoe maker, supplying 60 pairs of snowshoes to Commodore Robert Peary for an Arctic expedition.

Dunham died on September 27, 1931, in Lewiston, Maine, after a two-week illness, and was buried in Pine Grove Cemetery, South Paris, Maine.

References

External links
 

 

Musicians from Maine
1853 births
1931 deaths
American fiddlers
People from Norway, Maine
People from Lewiston, Maine

Burials at Pine Grove Cemetery (Brunswick, Maine)